Carin Anuschka ter Beek (born 29 December 1970 in Groningen) is a retired rower from the Netherlands. She won a silver medal in the women's eight in the 2000 Summer Olympics in Sydney, Australia.

References

 Dutch Olympic Committee 

1970 births
Living people
Dutch female rowers
Rowers at the 2000 Summer Olympics
Olympic rowers of the Netherlands
Olympic silver medalists for the Netherlands
Sportspeople from Groningen (city)
Delft University of Technology alumni
Olympic medalists in rowing
Medalists at the 2000 Summer Olympics
20th-century Dutch women
20th-century Dutch people
21st-century Dutch women